"Echo" is a song performed by American contemporary worship band Elevation Worship featuring Tauren Wells, released as the third single from Elevation Worship's eleventh live album, Hallelujah Here Below (2018), on August 31, 2018. The song was written by Alexander Pappas, Chris Brown, Israel Houghton, Matthews Ntlele and Steven Furtick. Chris Brown and Aaron Robertson handled the production of the single.

Background
In leading up to the September 2018 release of Hallelujah Here Below, "Echo" was released as the third single from the album, following the release of singles "Won't Stop Now" and "Here Again". The song was recorded in March 2018 at Elevation Ballantyne in Charlotte, North Carolina. Tauren Wells, in an interview with Jake Frederick of NewReleaseToday, shared that the collaboration came about after he connected with people from Elevation Church at the Inside Elevation conference. When he returned to Elevation Church another weekend to lead worship, where he led the song upon request before they asked him to feature on the song as part of the album. Wells described the song as "one of those songs that brings so much energy and joy into a room." 

On February 1, 2019, a Spanish rendition of the song, titled "Eco (Echo)" was released by Elevation Worship. On April 12, 2019, a revamped version of "Echo" was released on Elevation Worship's album Paradoxology (2019), a collection of revamped songs initially released on Hallelujah Here Below. The song, garnering early airplay from several radio stations, was set to impact Christian radio on July 26, 2019.

Composition

Music videos
Elevation Worship released the live music video of "Echo" featuring Tauren Wells recorded at Elevation Church's Ballantyne campus on their YouTube channel on August 31, 2018. On February 1, 2019, The lyric video of "Eco (Echo)" in Spanish was published on YouTube. The music video for the Paradoxology rendition of "Echo" shot on location at Savona Mill was published on Elevation Worship's YouTube channel on April 13, 2019.

Track listing

Charts

Weekly charts

Year-end charts

Release history

References

External links
 

2018 singles
Elevation Worship songs
Tauren Wells songs
2018 songs
Songs written by Steven Furtick